Trestonia frontalis is a species of beetle in the family Cerambycidae. It was described by Wilhelm Ferdinand Erichson in 1847. It is known from Brazil, Ecuador, Bolivia, Colombia and Peru.

References

frontalis
Beetles described in 1847